Niphargus hrabei is a species of crustacean in family Niphargidae. It is an originally Ponto-Caspian species that was found in the River Danube in Bavaria in the mid 1990s. It is now known to occur in Austria, Croatia, Hungary, Romania, Russia, Serbia and Montenegro, Slovakia, and Ukraine. It is listed as a vulnerable species on the IUCN Red List.

References

External links
 Niphargus Webpage - University of Ljubljana

Niphargidae
Freshwater crustaceans of Europe
Crustaceans described in 1932
Taxonomy articles created by Polbot